AXN Black is a channel operated by Sony Pictures Television International Networks Europe. Its programming is basically focused on action and crime television series and movies. The channel was first launched in Portugal, Angola and Mozambique on May 9, 2011 and replaced Animax. Central European version was launched on October 1, 2013 in Hungary, Poland, Romania, Czech Republic, Slovakia, Bulgaria and Moldova where has replaced AXN Sci Fi.
On October 3, 2017 the channel was replaced by Sony Movie Channel in Hungary. On February 17, 2020 the channel was replaced by AXN Movies in Portugal, Angola and Mozambique.

Logos

Current Programming
 Arrow
 Better Call Saul
 Blue Bloods
 Bones
 Childrens Hospital
 Cops
 Criminal Minds
 Dog the Bounty Hunter
 Eagleheart
 Fireball XL5
 Fringe
 Ghost Whisperer
 Grey's Anatomy
 Hannibal
 Hawaii Five-0
 Houdini & Doyle
 IZombie
 Law & Order: SVU
 M*A*S*H
 NCIS: Los Angeles
 NCIS: New Orleans
 NTSF:SD:SUV::
 Orange is the New Black
 Outlander
 Person of Interest
 Prison Break
 Quantico
 Rescue Me
 Roswell
 Sherlock
 The Blacklist
 The Blacklist: Redemption
 The Good Doctor
 The People's Court
 The Shield
 The Vampire Diaries
 The Walking Dead
 Unforgettable

Upcoming Programming
 Charlie's Angels (January 2019)
 The Fix (2019)
 The Twilight Zone (2019)
 Forensic Files (TBA)
 The First 48 (TBA 2019)

Former Programming
 The A-Team
 Airwolf
 Ally McBeal
 Angel
 Astro Boy
 Battlestar Galactica
 Baywatch
 Bonanza
 Boston Legal
 Breaking Bad
 Buffy the Vampire Slayer
 Burn Notice
 Charlie's Angels
 Chicago P.D.
 Cold Case
 Covert Affairs
 CSI: Crime Scene Investigation
 Damages
 Dirt
 Durham County
 Early Edition
 Elementary
 ER
 FlashForward
 Flashpoint
 General Hospital
 Graceland
 Hawthorne
 House
 Human Target
 In the Heat of the Night
 The Incredible Hulk
 JAG
 Justified
 K-9
 Knight Rider
 L.A. Law
 Law & Order
 Law & Order: Criminal Intent
 Leverage
 The Listener
 MacGyver
 Magnum P.I.
 Matador
 Medium
 Miami Vice
 Monk
 Motive
 Murder, She Wrote
 N.C.I.S.
 Numb3rs
 Pan Am
 Private Eyes
 Psych
 Quantum Leap
 Rookie Blue
 Saving Hope
 Sleepy Hollow
 Touched by an Angel
 The Twilight Zone
 The Twilight Zone (1982)
 The Twilight Zone (2002)
 Transporter: The Series
 Walker, Texas Ranger
 White Collar
 Without a Trace

References

AXN
Television stations in Portugal
Defunct television channels in Portugal
Defunct television channels in Hungary
Sony Pictures Entertainment
Sony Pictures Television
Portuguese-language television stations
Television channels and stations established in 2011
2011 establishments in Portugal
Television channels in Poland